San Juan City Hall (Spanish: Casa de la Alcaldía de San Juan, or just Alcaldía de San Juan) is the seat of government for the Autonomous Municipality of San Juan in Puerto Rico. The city hall is located in Old San Juan, in front of the Plaza de Armas and next to the Palace of the Royal Intendancy, which today hosts the Puerto Rico Department of State. 

The San Juan City Hall was built in stages from 1604 to 1789. It went through numerous additions and expansions throughout its history. Its current structure and façade by the square, inspired by the Casa de la Panadería in the Plaza Mayor of Madrid, dates to 1840 and was designed by architect Pedro García.

Features 

The city hall building has a large staircase and an inner courtyard which is open to visitors. The Plaza de Armas main entrance has an inscription in Latin which translates to "Esteem the light of justice whoever is at the service of their people". The first floor of the main building hosts tourism offices while the second floor houses the office of the Mayor of San Juan and the seat of municipal government.

One of its most famous rooms is the Sala Capitular (Spanish for chapter hall), a meeting hall that has hosted numerous historical events, such as the proclamation of Admiral Ramón Power y Giralt as the first representative for Puerto Rico at the Cortes de Cádiz in Spain in 1812 and the signing of the abolition of slavery in Puerto Rico in 1873. The city hall also hosts the San Juan Bautista Gallery, which often showcases works of art made by local artists.

Gallery

See also 
 List of mayors of San Juan, Puerto Rico

References

External links 
 Municipio de San Juan (Spanish)

Tourist attractions in San Juan, Puerto Rico
Buildings and structures in San Juan, Puerto Rico
Old San Juan, Puerto Rico
City and town halls in Puerto Rico
1604 establishments in the Spanish Empire
Buildings and structures completed in 1604
1842 establishments in Puerto Rico
Government buildings completed in 1842
17th century in Puerto Rico